is a Japanese anime director. She started her career in 1998 after joining Pierrot.

Biography
Chiaki Kon was born in September 29, at Chiba Prefecture, Japan. As a child, she used to watch and fan of Toei Animation's anime adaptation works, such as Saint Seiya, and Sailor Moon.

After graduating from Yoyogi Animation Academy, Kon interned at Pierrot, under anime director Jun Kamiya. She provided production advancement, and assistant storyboard episode 28 of Neo Ranga for Kamiya.

Kon then directed the anime adaptations of Higurashi When They Cry series at Studio Deen from 2006-2008 (including Higurashi When They Cry: Kai and Umineko When They Cry). She then directed the anime adaptation of Junjō Romantica series, and the spin-off series, The World's Greatest First Love series from 2008-2011.

At J.C. Staff, Kon directed two of the Nodame Cantabile series (Nodame Cantabile: Paris arc and Nodame Cantabile: Finale) in 2008 and 2011. She then directed Golden Time in 2013.

At Toei Animation, Kon directed the HappinessCharge PreCure! movie, titled HappinessCharge PreCure! the Movie: The Ballerina of the Land of Dolls in 2014, Kon was a fan of the previous Pretty Cure series, and had a dream of directing Pretty Cure, and so she asked producer Hiroaki Shibata that she wanted to direct, and became the film's director.
In 2016, Kon took Munehisa Sakai's position as a series director for Pretty Guardian Sailor Moon Crystal series after his departure, and directed the third season of the series, which covered the Infinity arc of the manga (known as Death Busters in Japan), titled Pretty Guardian Sailor Moon Crystal Season III.

Kon then directed the Sasuke Shinden: Book of Sunrise arc of Naruto Shippuden at Pierrot in late 2016. Then, she directed Back Street Girls at J.C. Staff, and Tokimeki Restaurant: Miracle 6 film at Production I.G in 2018.

Kon was initially set to direct the new Sanrio anime, titled Mewkledreamy for J.C. Staff, but later stepped down as a project consultant for unknown reasons, and her role was taken over by Hiroaki Sakurai.

In 2017, it was announced that Kon had returned to direct the fourth season of the Pretty Guardian Sailor Moon Crystal series, covering the Dream arc of the manga (known as Dead Moon in Japan). The fourth season was produced as a two-part theatrical anime film, titled Pretty Guardian Sailor Moon Eternal The Movie. The two-part film was animated with Toei Animation and Studio Deen, and was released in Japanese theaters in 2021, with the first film on January 8, and the second film on February 11.
That same year in 2021, Kon directed The Way of the Househusband at J.C. Staff, and was released on Netflix.

Filmography

TV series

Films

OVAs

Theme Park attraction

References

External links

Anime directors
Year of birth missing (living people)
Living people
People from Chiba Prefecture